Sintgaing Township is a township of Kyaukse District in the Mandalay Region of Burma (Myanmar).

Townships of Mandalay Region